The following lists events that happened during 1932 in Saudi Arabia.

Incumbents
 Monarch: Ibn Saud (starting September 26)

Events

Date unknown
 The Kingdom of Saudi Arabia was formed.

 
1930s in Saudi Arabia
Saudi Arabia
Saudi Arabia
Years of the 20th century in Saudi Arabia